A vermifilter (also vermi-digester or lumbrifilter) is an aerobic treatment system, consisting of a biological reactor containing media that filters organic material from wastewater. The media also provides a habitat for aerobic bacteria and composting earthworms that purify the wastewater by removing pathogens and oxygen demand. The "trickling action" of the wastewater through the media dissolves oxygen into the wastewater, ensuring the treatment environment is aerobic for rapid decomposition of organic substances.

Vermifilters are most commonly used for sewage treatment and for agro-industrial wastewater treatment. Vermifilters can be used for primary, secondary and tertiary treatment of sewage, including blackwater and greywater in on-site systems and municipal wastewater in large centralised systems. 

Vermifilters are used where wastewater requires treatment before being safely discharged into the environment. Treated effluent is disposed of to either surface or subsurface leach fields. Solid material (such as fecal matter and toilet paper) is retained, de-watered and digested by bacteria and earthworms into humus that is integrated into the filtration media. The liquid passes through the filtration media where the attached aerobic microorganisms biodegrade pathogens and other organic compounds, resulting in treated wastewater.

Vermifiltration is a low-cost aerobic wastewater treatment option. Because energy is not required for aeration, vermifilters can be considered "passive treatment" systems (pumps may be required if gravity flow is not possible). Another advantage is the high treatment efficiency given the low space requirement.

Terminology

Alternative terms used to describe the vermifiltration process include aerobic biodigester, biological filter with earthworms, or wet vermicomposting. The treatment system may be described using terms such as vermi-digester and vermi-trickling filter.

When this kind of sanitation system is used to treat only the mixture of excreta and water from flush toilets or pour-flush toilets (called blackwater) then the term "toilet" is added to the name of the process, such as vermifilter toilet.

Overview
Vermifiltration was first advocated by researchers at the University of Chile in 1992 as a low-cost sustainable technology suitable for decentralised sewage treatment in rural areas. Vermifilters offer treatment performance similar to conventional decentralised wastewater treatment systems, but with potentially higher hydraulic processing capacities.

Vermifilters are a type of wastewater treatment biofilter or trickling filter, but with the addition of earthworms to improve treatment efficiency. Vermifilters provide an aerobic environment and wet substrate that facilitates microorganism growth as a biofilm. Microorganisms perform biochemical degradation of organic matter present in wastewater. Earthworms regulate microbial biomass and activity by directly or/and indirectly grazing on microorganisms. Biofilm and organic matter consumed by composting earthworms is then digested into biologically inert castings (humus). The vermicast is incorporated into the media substrate, slowly increasing its volume. When this builds up, it can be removed and applied to soil as an amendment to improve soil fertility and structure.

Microorganisms present are heterotrophic and autotrophic. Heterotrophic microorganisms are important in oxidising carbon (decomposition), whereas autotrophic microorganisms are important in nitrification.

As a result of oxidation reactions, biodegradation and microbial stimulation by enzymatic action, organic matter decomposition and pathogen destruction occurs in the vermifilter. In a study where municipal wastewater was treated in a vermifilter, removal ratios for biochemical oxygen demand (BOD5) were 90%, chemical oxygen demand (COD) 85%, total suspended solids (TSS) 98%, ammonia nitrogen 75% and fecal coliforms eliminated to a level that meets World Health Organisation guidelines for safe re-use in crops.

Process types 
Vermifilters can be used for primary, secondary and tertiary treatment of blackwater and greywater.

Primary treatment of blackwater 

Vermifilters can be used for aerobic primary treatment of domestic blackwater. Untreated blackwater enters a ventilated enclosure above a bed of filter medium. Solids accumulate on the surface of the filter bed while liquid drains through the filter medium and is discharged from the reactor. The solids (feces and toilet paper) are aerobically digested by aerobic bacteria and composting earthworms into castings (humus), thereby significantly reducing the volume of organic material.

Primary treatment vermifilter reactors are designed to digest solid material, such as contained in raw sewage. Twin-chamber parallel reactors offer the advantage of being able to allow one to rest, while the other is active, in order to facilitate hygienic removal of humus with reduced pathogen levels.

Worms actively digest the solid organic material. Over time, an equilibrium is reached in which the volume digested by a stable population of worms is equal to the input volume of solid waste. Seasonal and environmental factors (such as temperature) and variable influent volumes can cause buildup of solid waste as a pile. Although oxygen is excluded from the centre of this "wet" compost pile, worms work from the outside in and introduce air as necessary into the pile to meet their nutritional requirements. This food resource buffer ensures primary treatment vermifilters have a level of resilience and reliability, provided space is provided for a pile to build up. There is some evidence that the wet environment facilitates digestion of solid waste by worms. The volume of vermicast humus increases only slowly and occasionally needs to be removed from the primary treatment reactor.

Primary treatment of wet mixed blackwater can also include greywater containing food solids, grease and other biodegradable waste. Solid material is reduced to stable humus (worm castings), with volume reductions of up to tenfold.

The process produces primary treated blackwater, with much of the solid organic material removed from the effluent. Because liquid effluent is discharged almost immediately on entering the digester, little dissolved oxygen is consumed by the wastewater through the filtration stage. However, oxygen demand is leached into the wastewater flow through the filter as worms digest the retained solids. This oxygen demand can be removed with secondary treatment vermifilter reactors. Primary treatment vermifilters provide a similar level of liquid effluent treatment to a septic tank, but in less time because digestion of solids by worms takes place rapidly in an aerobic environment.

The liquid effluent is either discharged directly to a drain field or undergoes secondary treatment before being used for surface or subsurface irrigation of agricultural soil.

Secondary treatment

Secondary and tertiary treatment vermifilters can be underneath the primary vermifilter in a single tower, but are typically single reactors, where several reactors can be chained in series as sequential vermifilters. Drainage within the reactor is provided by filter media packed according to the hydraulic conductivity and permeability of each material that is present within the vermifilter. The filter packing retains the solid particles present in the effluent wastewater, increases the hydraulic retention time and also provides a suitable habitat for sustaining a population of composting earthworms. This population requires adequate moisture levels within the filter media, but also adequate drainage and oxygen levels.

Sprinklers or drippers can be used in secondary and tertiary treatment vermifilter reactors (see image).

Hydraulic factors (hydraulic retention time, hydraulic loading rate and organic loading rate) and biological factors (earthworm numbers, levels of biofilm) can influence treatment efficiency.

Design 
Vermifilters are enclosed reactors made from durable materials that eliminate the entry of vermin, usually plastic or concrete. Ventilation must be sufficient to ensure an aerobic environment for the worms and microorganisms, while also inhibiting entry of unwanted flies. Temperature within the reactor needs to be maintained within a range suitable for the species of compost worms used.

Influent entry 
Influent entry is from above the filter media. Full-flush toilets can have the entry point into the side of the reactor, whereas micro-flush toilets, because these do not provide sufficient water to convey solids through sewer pipes, are generally installed directly above the reactor. For primary treatment reactors, sufficient vertical space must be provided for growth of the pile. This is dependent on the volume of solids in the influent and the presence of slower decomposing materials such as toilet paper. Secondary and tertiary treatment reactors can use sprinklers or tricklers to distribute the influent wastewater evenly over the filter media to improve treatment efficiency of the filter media.

Filter substrate 
Drainage within the vermifilter reactor is provided by the filter media. The filter media has the dual purpose of retaining the solid organic material, while also providing a habitat suitable for sustaining a population of composting worms. This population requires adequate moisture levels within the media, along with good drainage and aerobic conditions.

Vermifilter reactors may comprise a single section packed only with organic media, or up to three filter sections comprising an organic top layer that provides habitat for the earthworms, an inorganic upper layer of sand and lower layer of gravel. The filter sits on top of a sump or drainage layer of coarse gravel, rocks or pervious plastic drainage coil where the treated effluent is discharged and/or recirculated to the top of the reactor. Alternatively the filter media may be suspended above the sump in a basket. Synthetic geotextile cloth is sometimes used to retain the filter media in place above the drainage layer. To remain aerobic, adequate ventilation must be provided, along with an outlet for the liquid effluent to drain away.

Common filter packing materials include sawdust, wood chips, coir, bark, peat, and straw for the organic layer. Gravel, quartz sand, round stones, pumice, mud balls, glass balls, ceramsite and charcoal are commonly used for the inorganic layer. The surface area and porosity of these filter materials influence treatment performance. Materials with low granulometry (small particles) and large surface area may improve the performance of the vermifilter but impede its drainage.

Sizing 
Vermifilters can be constructed as single tower systems, or separate staged reactors (either gravity or pump operated) for the treatment of wastewater according to design requirements (primary, secondary, tertiary treatment). More stages  can increase the degree of treatment because multiple stage systems provide accumulating aerobic conditions suitable for nitrification of ammonium and removal of COD.

The design parameters of vermifilters include stocking density of earthworms (although over time earthworm population tends to be self-moderating), filter media composition, hydraulic loading rate, hydraulic retention time and organic loading rate. Hydraulic retention time and hydraulic loading rate both affect effluent quality. Hydraulic retention time is the actual time the wastewater is in contact with the filter media and is related to the depth of the vermifilter (which may increase over time due to the accumulation of earthworm vermicastings), reactor volume and type of material used (porosity). The hydraulic retention time determines wastewater inflow rate (hydraulic loading as influent volume per hour).

In principle, provided the environment is aerobic, the longer the wastewater remains inside the filter, the greater the BOD5 and COD removal efficiency will be, but at the expense of hydraulic loading. Wastewater requires sufficient contact time with the biofilm to allow for the adsorption, transformation, and reduction of contaminants. The hydraulic loading rate is an essential design parameter, consisting of the volume of wastewater that a vermifilter can reasonably treat in a given amount of time. For a given system, higher hydraulic loading rates will cause hydraulic retention time to decrease and therefore reduce level of treatment. Hydraulic loading rate may depend on parameters such as structure, effluent quality and bulk density of filter packing, along with method of effluent application. Common hydraulic retention time values in vermifiltration systems range from 1 to 3 hours. Hydraulic loading rates commonly vary between 0.2 m3 m−2 day−1, 3.0 m3 m−2 day−1  or 10–20 g L−1. Organic loading rate is defined as the amount of soluble and particulate organic matter (as BOD5) per unit area per unit time.

Treatment efficiency is influenced by health, maturity and population abundance of the earthworms. Abundance is a fundamental parameter for efficient operation of a vermifiltration system. Different values are reported in the literature, usually in grams or number of individuals per volume of filter packing or surface area of filter packing. Common densities vary between 10 g L−1 and 40 g L−1 of filter packing material.

An abundance of earthworms improves treatment efficiency, in particular BOD5, TSS and NH4+ removal. This is because earthworms release organic matter into the filter media and stimulate nitrogen mineralization. Earthworm castings may have substances which contribute to higher BOD5 removal.

Operation and maintenance
A vermifilter has low mechanical and manual maintenance requirements, and, where gravity operated, requires no energy input. Recirculation, if required for improved effluent quality, would require a pump. 

Occasional topping up of organic materials may be required as these decompose and reduce in volume. The volume of worm castings increases only slowly and occasionally vermicompost needs to be removed from the vermifilter.

Solids accumulate on the surface of the organic filter media (or filter packing). The liquid fraction drains through the medium into the sump or equaliser and is either discharged from the reactor or recirculated to the top for further treatment. Wastewater is discharged to the surface of the filter material by direct application or by sprinklers, drippers or tricklers.

Examples

 Construction of primary and secondary domestic vermifilters from readily available materials
A household pour-flush toilet, with combined primary vermifiltration and direct effluent infiltration into the soil below, is called the "Tiger Toilet" and has been tested by Bear Valley Ventures and Primove Infrastructure Development Consultants in rural India. Unlike a pit latrine , it was found that there was virtually no accumulation of fecal material over a one-year period. In the effluent, there was a 99% reduction in fecal coliforms . User satisfaction is high, driven mainly by a lack of odour. This system is now being marketed commercially in India, where over 2000 of these toilets and treatment systems had been sold and installed by May 2017.
 "Tiger worm toilets" are also being promoted by Oxfam as a sanitation solution in refugee camps, slums and peri-urban areas in Africa, for example in Liberia.
 Low-flush vermifilter toilet systems with direct subsoil soakage are being marketed in Ghana and other African countries by the Ghana Sustainable Aid Project (GSAP) with support by Providence College in the U.S. and the University of Ghana.
 Biofilcom is a company active in Ghana which is marketing the process under the name of "Biofil Digester".
 In Australia and New Zealand, there are numerous suppliers offering vermifilter systems for domestic greywater and/or blackwater treatment, with primary treated effluent disposal to subsurface leach fields. Examples include Wormfarm, Zenplumb, Naturalflow, SWWSNZ and Autoflow.

See also

Composting toilet
List of wastewater treatment technologies 
Sanitation
Trickling filter
Urine-diverting dry toilet
Ecological sanitation
Reuse of excreta

References

External links 
Innoqua Project -- combines vermifilters and filters using Daphnia, microalgae, and other organisms to treat wastewater and has this summary of vermifilters..

Sanitation